Marno van Greuning (born 27 August 1997) is a South African cricketer. He made his first-class debut for Free State in the 2018–19 CSA 3-Day Provincial Cup on 28 February 2019.

References

External links
 

1997 births
Living people
South African cricketers
Free State cricketers
Place of birth missing (living people)